Osnakəran (also, Osnagaran and Osnakeran) is a village and municipality in the Yardymli Rayon of Azerbaijan.  It has a population of 780.

References 

Populated places in Yardimli District